Cymindis limbata is a species of ground beetle in the subfamily Harpalinae. It was described by Pierre François Marie Auguste Dejean in 1831.

References

limbata
Beetles described in 1831